Anagnostis Anastasopoulos (Greek: Αναγνώστης Αναστασόπουλος) was a Greek politician and fighter in the Greek Revolution of 1821.

Biography 
He was from the village of Ligourio, Peloponnese. He served as a soldier and fought in the siege of Nafplio. He later followed a political career and became a senator in the Peloponnesian Senate and a deputy in the Fourth National Assembly at Argos.

References 

Year of birth missing
Year of death missing
People from Epidaurus
Greek people of the Greek War of Independence
19th-century Greek politicians